Yalti Napangati (born around 1970) is an Australian Aboriginal artist. She is a painter of the Western Desert style of art, and paints for the Papunya Tula school. Her husband, Warlimpirrnga, is also a well-known artist. They were both members of the famous Pintupi Nine, the last group of Aborigines living a traditional way of life in Australia.

Yalti was born in the Great Sandy Desert, sometime around 1970. She and her family lived as nomads in the desert, travelling along the western side of Lake Mackay. Most other Pintupi families had moved into settlements during the 1950s, but Yalti's father kept the family away from these. Her parents were Lanti (or "Joshua") and Nanu. She has an older brother, Tamayinya, and a younger sister, Yukultji. She married Warlimpirrnga sometime during the early 1980s, possibly when she was as young as 12. She and her family came out of the desert in 1984. She now lives at Kiwirrkurra, and has two sons and two daughters.

Yalti finished her first paintings for Papunya Tula in June 1996. She makes acrylic paintings of landscapes associated with Pintupi dreaming stories. Her paintings are of important places in her country, around Marruwa, Laurryi, Wirrulnga and Patjarr.

References 

Indigenous Australian artists
Living people
Australian painters
1970s births
Pintupi
Australian women painters
21st-century Australian women artists
21st-century Australian artists